Goose Lake State Recreation Area is located on Stateline Road, between New Pine Creek, Oregon and Goose Lake in Lake County, Oregon, on the east side of Goose Lake on the Oregon–California border.

References

External links 
 
 

State parks of Oregon
Parks in Lake County, Oregon